Nkolo is the seventh album by singer, songwriter and composer Lokua Kanza.

References

2010 albums
Lokua Kanza albums